The Remenham Challenge Cup is a rowing event for women's eights at the annual Henley Royal Regatta on the River Thames at Henley-on-Thames in England.  It is open to female crews from all eligible rowing clubs. Two or more clubs may combine to make an entry.

History
In 1998, the first invitation event was held for women's eight, which in 1999 became an open event known as the Henley Prize. In 2002, the Remenham Club presented a trophy in memory of its late President, Ian Rogers M.B.E., and the event was subsequently renamed The Remenham Challenge.

Winners

As Invitation Eights

As Henley Prize

As Remenham Challenge Cup

References

Events at Henley Royal Regatta
Rowing trophies and awards